Under Southern Skies is a 1984 video game published by The Avalon Hill Game Company.

Gameplay
Under Southern Skies is a game in which the player must contend with one German warship in the shipping lanes of the South Atlantic, in a strategic tactical naval wargame.

Reception
Johnny Wilson reviewed the game for Computer Gaming World, and stated that "USS has a few relatively minor problems [...] but it makes up for them in the graphic presentation."

References

External links
Review in Electronic Games

1984 video games
Apple II games
Apple II-only games
Avalon Hill video games
Computer wargames
Naval video games
Turn-based strategy video games
Video games developed in the United States
Video games set in South America